Streptococcus cricetus is a species of Streptococcus.

References

Streptococcaceae